Tales of the Velvet Comet is a series of four science-fiction novels by Mike Resnick. The Velvet Comet, one of the many leisure and entertainment enterprises owned by the galaxy-spanning Vainmill Corporation, is a barbell-shaped space station that serves as the galaxy's most exclusive bordello to the rich and (in-)famous.

The four novels which comprise the series look in on four periods of the Velvet Comet's lifespan, from early on in the Comet's life (Eros Ascending) to a period after the Comet's decommissioning (Eros at Nadir).

Eros Ascending (1984)
Eros at Zenith (1984)
Eros Descending (1985)
Eros at Nadir (1986)

American erotic novels
Science fiction book series
Science fiction erotica
American science fiction novels
American novel series